The South Indian Derby, also known as the Southern Derby or Southern Rivalry, is the name given to a football derby contested by any two of the three professional football clubs from South India—Bengaluru FC, Chennaiyin FC and Kerala Blasters FC. The geographical proximity of the clubs contributes significantly to the rivalries. Along with this, the competition between the West Block Blues and Manjappada—the fan clubs of Bengaluru FC and the Blasters respectively—intensifies the rivalry among those two clubs.

Bengaluru was founded in 2013; the Blasters and Chennaiyin were founded one year later. The first South Indian Derby was in 2014, when Kerala and Chennaiyin first met in the inaugural season of the Indian Super League. Bengaluru joined the Indian Super League (ISL) in 2017, playing in the same division with the Blasters and Chennaiyin for the first time. They played their first Southern Derby against Chennaiyin FC on 17 December 2017, and played their first match against the Kerala Blasters on 31 December 2017.

History

Karnataka, Kerala and Tamil Nadu are the three among the five states from South India that also shares their borders. Kerala Blasters is based in Kochi, in Kerala's west; Chennaiyin FC is based in Chennai, in Tamil Nadu's north east; Bengaluru FC is based in Bengaluru, in Karnataka's south east. Though Hyderabad FC, located in Telangana, geopolitically a South Indian state, the club is generally not considered in the derby because of its location and it being a relatively new club in the league.

Bengaluru FC was founded in July 2013 as a direct entrant to play in the 2013-14 I League season. Concurrently, there were plans to start a new tournament between eight new clubs; the ISL was officially launched on 21 October 2013 by IMG–Reliance, Star Sports, and the All India Football Federation. Kerala Blasters and Chennaiyin FC were founded in 2014 as the league's only South Indian clubs. The first official South Indian Derby took place on 21 October 2014 at Marina Arena where Chennaiyin won the match 2–1 against Kerala Blasters. However, the rivalry between Chennaiyin and Blasters took shape in December 2014, when the Blasters defeated Chennaiyin 4–3 on aggregate in the semifinals to enter the 2014 season final. In 2017, the AIFF approved the proposition to simultaneously run the ISL and I-League in the short–term, with the ISL to become Indian football's top tier in the near future. As part of a league expansion, the ISL's organizers accepted bids for two new franchises in the 2017–18 Indian Super League season; Bengaluru FC won the bid for one of the slots. For the first time, South India's three dominant clubs competed in India's top football league; a new derby atmosphere developed, similar to that of the Kolkata Derby.

Bengaluru FC v Chennaiyin FC 
Bengaluru and Chennaiyin first met on 17 December 2017 at Sree Kanteerava Stadium, the home ground of Bengaluru FC, with the match ending 1–2 in favour of Chennaiyin. They met face-to-face three times that season; the last occasion was in the finals of 2017–18 Indian Super League season, where Chennaiyin defeated Bengaluru 2–3, thereby clinching their second Indian Super League title. Since then, both teams' fans had started to develop a rivalry. The rivalry between fans and players grew more intense when the fans of Chennaiyin FC displayed a controversial banner speaking out about Raphael Augusto, when he left Chennaiyin to play for Bengaluru during the 2019-20 Indian Super League season. Since the fans' first confrontation, a match between Bengaluru FC and Chennaiyin FC is one of the most awaited in the Southern Derby.

By competition

Full list of results
Score lists home team first.

Note: Not included friendly matches.

Bengaluru FC v Kerala Blasters FC 
Kerala Blasters and Bengaluru FC first met on 31 December 2017, with Bengaluru winning the match 3–1. However, the rivalry between the Blasters and Bengaluru is a unique one in Indian football as it developed even before the pair played against each other. The rivalry originates from the competition between both clubs' fan bases—Manjappada of the Blasters and Bengaluru's West Block Blues. When Bengaluru FC joined the Indian Super League in 2017, it was also announced that C. K. Vineeth and Rino Anto, who both played for Kerala Blasters in 2016 season on loan from Bengaluru, would be signing permanently with the Blasters. When Bengaluru played at home against the North Korean side April 25 SC in the first leg of the AFC Cup Inter-Zone in August 2017, both Vineeth and Anto were present at Kanteerava to witness the game. Even though the majority of West Block Blues began singing their specialized chants for Vineeth and Rino Anto, acknowledging their presence and their contributions to the club, a number of supporters among the group also started abusive chanting against Kerala Blasters. Later tension between the groups began when Rino Anto expressed his displeasure over the incident on social media. The rivalry intensified when the groups started going against each other posting banter on social media. It was in the 2021 Durand Cup that the two sides met for the first time outside the ISL with Bengaluru winning the match 2–0 at full-time on 15 September 2021.

With a new format for the playoffs of the 2022–23 Indian Super League season, Bengaluru and Kerala Blasters met against each other in the knockout stage match on 3 March 2023, which took an unusual turn. The Blasters players forfeited the knockout match in the extra-time following the controversy around the legitimacy of the free-kick goal scored by  the Bengaluru captain Sunil Chhetri in the 96th minute. The Blasters players and staff argued that the free-kick was taken before the Blasters players set themselves in their defensive positions. The referee gave Sunil Chhetri's goal the greenlight, and the infuriated Blasters coach Ivan Vukomanović called-off his players from the pitch into the dressing room. Following the discussion with the match commissioner, the referee blew the final whistle and Bengaluru was awarded the win. This match was met with immense criticism from fans and pundits and added to tensions between both the clubs. Kerala Blasters management then appealed to the AIFF for the match to be replayed and protested for the match referee Crystal John to banned from refereeing. A separate AIFF disciplinary panel was met on 6 March to decide on the possible sanction on Kerala Blasters for waking out of the game, but the disciplinary committee rejected the Blasters' protest to replay the match. The AIFF DC rejected the appeal of the Blasters citing that the case did not fall in the exception mentioned in the Article 70.5 of the AIFF disciplinay code. AIFF further issued a notice to the Blasters for the walkout as a punishable offence under the violation Article 58 of AIFF disciplinary code which states that if a team refuses to play a match that was in progress, the club has to pay 'at least rupees six lakh' as penalty, and in serious cases, the club would be penalized six lakh rupees and would be disqualified from a competition in progress and/or would be excluded from taking part in a future competition. Just four days from this controversial match and the rejection of the Blasters' appeal, Bengaluru and Kerala Blasters were drawn in the same group of the 2023 Indian Super Cup tournament that is to be held in EMS Stadium in Kozhikode, Kerala.  

Since their first meeting in December 2017, the match between the Blasters and Bengaluru is one of the most anticipated derbies in the Indian football and in the league and is often referred to as the 'Real South Indian Derby'.

By competition

Full list of results
Score lists home team first.

Note: Not included friendly matches.

Chennaiyin FC v Kerala Blasters FC 
Kerala Blasters and Chennaiyin FC were founded in 2014 as two of the eight clubs competing in the Indian Super League's (ISL) inaugural season. Their first match was on 21 October 2014 at Marina Arena, with Chennaiyin winning 2–1. Chennaiyin won the second match, at Kochi, 1–0. The clubs played each other again in the semi-finals of that season's playoffs; in the first of two legs, the Blasters defeated Chennaiyin 3–0. At the end of regular time in the second leg, Chennaiyin led 3–0 on the night, levelling the tie 3–3 on aggregate and sending it to extra time. However, in the 116th minute, Stephen Pearson scored for the Blasters, giving them a 4–3 win on aggregate.

In 2016, Chennaiyin manager Marco Materazzi was suspended for one match after his involvement in a scuffle between a Chennaiyin and a Kerala Blasters player. This incident led to Blasters' fans wearing Zinedine Zidane masks at the return leg in Kochi, intensifying the clubs' rivalry.

By competition

Full list of results
Score lists home team first.

Note: Not included friendly matches.

Statistics

All-time results

This table includes all matches played between the teams. From the first game played between Kerala Blasters FC and Chennaiyin FC on 21 October 2014, to the most recent South Indian Derby between Bengaluru FC and Kerala Blasters FC on 3 March 2023.

Note: Not included friendly match statistics.

Head-to-head ranking in Indian Super League (2014–present) 
This list includes the regular season performance of the three clubs that compete in the derby.

Notes:

 Bengaluru FC was not part of the first three seasons of the Indian Super League. They came in as one of two new entries from the 2017–18 season onward.
 The first three seasons of the Indian Super League were finished in the same year with the regular season running from October to December. In the 2017–18 season, ISL started to follow a regular season running from November to March.

Records

Match records

Highest scoring matches 

Notes:

 This table includes only the matches from the derby with five or more goals in total.
 Not included friendly matches.

Individual records

Appearances 

Notes:

 This table includes the top five players with the most appearances in the derby. Players in bold are still active on one of the teams that participates in the derby.
 Not included friendly match appearances.

Goal-scorers

Notes:

 This table includes the top five all-time goal scorers in the derby. Players in bold are still active on one of the teams that participates in the derby.
 Not included friendly match goals.

Assists 

Notes:

 This table includes the top five players with the most assists in the derby. Players in bold are still active on one of the teams that participate in the derby.
 Not included friendly match assists.

Hat-tricks 
This table includes the players, who scored three goals in a derby match.

Notes:

 Scores of the home teams are given first.
 Not included friendly match hat-tricks.

Honours

All competitions 
This table includes all the trophies that the clubs won across all competitions since their first appearance in the Indian Super League.

Performance in the ISL by title 
This table includes all the trophies that the clubs won within the league since their first appearance in the Indian Super League.

Notable matches

Chennaiyin FC 2–1 Kerala Blasters FC (21 October 2014)
This was the first ever match to take pace in the derby. The match took place in Jawaharlal Nehru Stadium in Chennai on 21 October 2014. Elano Blumer put Chennaiyin in front in the early moments of the match in the 14th minute who netted the ball after Chennaiyin was awarded with a penalty for a foul committed by Gurwinder Singh of Kerala Blasters against Chennaiyin's Abhishek Das in penalty box. The Blasters drawn level through Iain Hume, who scored a close range goal from Pulga's corner-kick in the 50th minute of the match. But Chennaiyin took the lead again, as they scored their second and final goal of the night through Bernard Mendy, who scored a bicycle kick in the 63rd minute from a Khabra's header set up by Elano as the Marina Machans won the first ever match in the southern derby.

Kerala Blasters FC 3–0 Chennaiyin FC (13 December 2014)
This match was one of the first legs of the 2014 Indian Super League semi-finals, which was the third-ever match between these two clubs and is considered one of the causes that sparked the rivalry between them. The match took place in Kochi and had an attendance of 60,900. Ishfaq Ahmed scored the first goal for Blasters in the 27th minute and two minutes later Iain Hume scored their second goal. Many fans consider Sushant's goal as one of the greatest goals in the club's history.

Kerala Blasters FC 1–3 Chennaiyin FC (16 December 2014)
This match was the second leg of one of the semi-finals which took place in Chennai and is considered to be one of the most dramatic matches in the history of the Indian Super League. Kerala Blasters suffered an early setback as their defender Jamie McAllister received a second yellow card during the 28th minute for kicking a Chennaiyin FC player, Bernard Mendy. Mikaël Silvestre opened the score sheet for Chennaiyin in the 42nd minute of the game. During the 50th minute, Chennaiyin received a penalty because of a foul committed by Sandesh Jhingan, but Marco Materazzi missed the shot by hitting it wide of the left post. Chennaiyin then got their second goal when Jhingan scored an own goal while clearing the ball in the 76th minute. Chennaiyin FC levelled the semi-final on an aggregate score of 3–3 in the 90th minute, when Jeje found the net taking the match to extra time. During the 104th minute of the game, Marco Materazzi was sent off after receiving a second yellow card reducing Chennaiyin to ten men. In extra time, Stephen Pearson scored the decisive goal for the Blasters in the 117th minute to win the tie 4–3 on aggregate to move into the final. Just before the final whistle, during the 119th minute, Chennaiyin FC midfielder Bojan Djordjic received a red card.

Chennaiyin FC 4–1 Kerala Blasters (21 November 2015)
This was the first meeting between the two sides in the 2015 Indian Super League season. The match started with an early goal by Chennaiyin in the 3rd minute when Dhanachandra Singh scored a volley past the Kerala Blasters goalkeeper Stephen Bywater to open the score-sheet. Chennaiyin doubled their lead through Stiven Mendoza, who netted the ball in the 16th minute of the game. Mendoza then went on to score two more goals in the 79th and 81st minutes of the match respectively to complete his hat-trick and took Chennaiyin to a 4–0 lead before Antonio German scored a relief goal for the Blasters in the 90th minute from a ball that deflected off from the body of the goal-scorer Dhanachandra Singh. The match finally ended 4–1 in favour of Chennaiyin.

Bengaluru FC 1–2 Chennaiyin FC (17 December 2017) 
This match, which took place at Kanteerava Stadium, was the first-ever Southern Derby match for Bengaluru FC. Jeje Lalpekhlua put Chennaiyin in front when he put the ball past the Bengaluru goalkeeper Gurpreet Singh Sandhu after the ball deflected off the body of Sunil Chhetri just five minutes into the match in the first-half. However, Chhetri could score the equalizer for the Bengaluru in the last moments of the second-half, when he netted an angled shot from a Toni Dovale's ball in the 85th minute. The match was destined to go to a single goal draw before Dhanpal Ganesh scored the match winner in the 88th minute for Chennaiyin, when he scored a header from the ball slotted in by Rene Mihelič to seal the victory for Chennaiyin by the score of 1–2 at full-time.

Kerala Blasters FC 1–3 Bengaluru FC (31 December 2017)
This was the first-ever southern derby match between Kerala Blasters and Bengaluru. After a goalless first-half, a handball by Sandesh Jhingan in the penalty box allowed Bengaluru to break the deadlock after Chhetri converted the penalty into a goal in the 60th minute of the match. Miku put the game to bed and sealed the victory for Bengaluru by scoring two goals in the stoppage time, when he scored his first goal of the night in the 3rd minute into stoppage time from a through-ball from Edu Garcia and scored his second of the night just one minute after his first goal, when Subhasish Bose set Miku up as he netted the ball in the center of the net. Courage Pekuson scored a consolation goal for the Blasters in the last minute of the stoppage time, but it was not enough for the Blasters to avoid a 1–3 defeat. After the final whistle, Sunil Chhetri was applauded off the pitch by the Kerala Blasters supporters.

Bengaluru FC 2–3 Chennaiyin FC (17 March 2018)
The 2017-18 Indian Super League final saw the two South Indian clubs meet in the final for the first time in the league's history. The match was held in Sree Kanteerava Stadium, Bengaluru. This was Bengaluru FC's first appearance in an Indian Super League final. Sunil Chhetri opened the score sheet in the ninth minute of the game. Chennaiyin levelled the match in the 17th minute with a goal by Maílson Alves. He found the net again just before the half-time during the 45th minute. During the 67th minute, Raphael Augusto scored the third goal for Chennaiyin, taking the lead to 3–1. Though Bengaluru got their second goal by Miku in the injury time, the match concluded 2–3 in favour of Chennaiyin and they clinched their second Indian Super League title.

Kerala Blasters FC 3–0 Chennaiyin FC (15 February 2019)
This match was an important match for the Blasters as it was the first time since November 2016 that they had defeated Chennaiyin FC. Matej Poplatnik scored the opener for the Kerala Blasters in Kochi with a thumping header, which he headed in after the ball was lofted up in the air following a save by the Chennaiyin goalkeeper Karanjit Singh. The Blasters doubled their lead through Poplatnik himself, who competed his brace in the 55th minute from a Slaviša Stojanović assist from an unmarked position. The Blasters would go on to score their third and final goal of match in the 71st minute when the local boy Sahal Abdul Samad scored his first ever ISL goal, which originated from a Chennaiyin's defensive error as the Blasters would go on to win the match 3–0 at home and ended their 14-game winless streak at full-time.

Bengaluru FC 3–0 Chennaiyin FC (10 November 2019)
This was the first meeting between both sides in the 2019-20 Indian Super League. An early header goal by Erik Paartalu that resulted from a Dimas Delgado's corner kick put Bengaluru in front in the 14th minute of the match. In the 25th minute, the Bengaluru skipper Sunil Chhetri took Bengaluru into a 2–0 lead with a first-time ball before half-time. Though Chennaiyin had their fair share of chances, the match was quiet for the most of the second-half until the 84th minute when Thongkhosiem Haokip netted the third goal of the night for Bengaluru from a Paartalu's assist, as he outpowered the Chennaiyin defender Eli Sabiá to poke the ball through the keeper Vishal Kaith, as the match ended 3–0 in favour of the Blues.

Kerala Blasters FC 3–6 Chennaiyin FC (1 February 2020)
This match became the highest scoring Southern Derby match in its history and is also one of the highest scoring games in the Indian Super League. Chennaiyin took the lead in the 39th minute after Kerala Blasters goalkeeper TP Rehenesh miss-passed the ball straight to Rafael Crivellaro who broke the deadlock before half-time. Nerijus Valskis netted the ball in the 45th minute for Chennaiyin and Crivellaro completed his brace just one minute after the goal scored by Valskis in the added time. Bartholomew Ogbeche scored the first goal for the Kerala Blasters in the 48th minute. Chennaiyin responded to the goal scored by the rivals, as Lalianzuala Chhangte scored his first of the night in the 59th minute. Chhangte's goal was followed by two another goals by Ogbeche for the Kerala Blasters, who completed his hat-trick by the 76th minute, and took the scoreline to 3–4. Chennaiyin retaliated, as both Chhangte and Valskis both scored another goal, thus completing their respective braces. The match ended 3–6 at full-time for Chennaiyin with three braces for the latter and a hat-trick for the Kerala Blasters.

Kerala Blasters FC 2–1 Bengaluru FC (15 February 2020)
This match saw the Blasters defeating Bengaluru FC for the first time in Indian Super League. Deshorn Brown gave Bengaluru the lead in the 16th minute. Just before the end of the first half, Albert Serran committed a foul on Blasters' captain Bartholomew Ogbeche just outside the box and conceded a free kick. Zuiverloon laid it off for Ogbeche to blast a fierce low shot to score a goal. Ogbeche scored the winner in the 70th minute from a penalty, sealing the victory for the Blasters.

Kerala Blasters FC 2–1 Bengaluru FC (20 January 2021)
This is considered as a game, that had one of the most dramatic ending in the history of derby. A goal by Cleiton Silva in the first half gave Bengaluru, the early lead. The Blasters equalised with the goal of Puitea in the 72nd minute. In the injury time, Paartalu's overhead kick should have given Bengaluru the lead again. But it hit on the bar, went loose and the Blasters launched the counter attack. Assisted by Hooper, Rahul KP race down to the right flank and scored the winner in the 94th minute sealing the victory for the Blasters.

 Bengaluru FC 2–0 Kerala Blasters FC (15 September 2021)
This was the first ever southern derby match to occur outside the Indian Super League. This match between Bengaluru and the Blasters happened in the group stages of the 2021 Durand Cup. Held in Salt Lake Stadium in Kolkata, the Blasters' created more chances in the initial parts of the first-half, but failed to register any goals. The deadlock was broken by Bengaluru's Namgyal Bhutia, when he netted a free-kick right before the half-time in the 45th minute of the game. The match took a different turn in the second-half, when the Blasters side saw three red cards. Hormipam was the first one to be sent-off in the 62nd minute. Then it was Sandeep, who saw the red in the 83rd minute. Meitei was the third player, who was sent-off during the 85th minute, downing the Blasters side to 8. Between these dramatic scenes, Leon Augustine scored the second goal for Bengaluru in the 71st minute, thus rising the lead for Bengaluru, and paving their way to a 2–0 victory.

Chennaiyin FC 2–4 Bengaluru FC (30 December 2021)
This match is one of the highest scoring matches in the history of the derby. Chennaiyin took an early lead through a goal scored by Mirlan Murzaev in the 4th minute, but the score was levelled by Cleiton Silva, when he netted a penalty in the 38th minute of the game. Alan Costa's goal put Bengaluru to the lead for the first time in the match minutes before the half-time, which was met by Chennaiyin's Rahim Ali's equaliser in the 49th minute of the game. The match went goalless for the next 20 minutes until Udanta Singh broke the deadlock with a shot from right flank, and took Bengaluru to the leading position for the second time in the game, rising the score to 2–3. The match was sealed for Bengaluru as Pratik Chaudhari scored the fourth goal for them four minutes after Udanta Singh found the net, thus helping Bengaluru to end their seven-match winless streak with a score of 2–4 at Tilak Maidan Stadium.

Kerala Blasters FC 3–2 Bengaluru FC (11 December 2022)
Being one of the highest scoring matches in the history of the derby, this match saw the return of southern derby to the Jawaharlal Nehru Stadium in Kochi. Bengaluru had the upperhand in the match when they netted an early penalty in the 14th minute through their skipper Sunil Chhetri, who received a foul in the penalty box and found the net from the spot. The Blasters were soon to equalize as they levelled the score through defender Marko Lešković, who scored a goal for the Blasters just nine minutes after Bengaluru had opened the scoresheet. The Blasters found their lead through Dimitrios Diamantakos in the 43rd minute and further extended their lead to 3–1 when the substitute Apostolos Giannou scored a narrow-angle goal for the Blasters. Even though Javi Hernández scored a second goal for Bengaluru in the 81st minute of the game, it was not enough for the Blues to avoid a defeat, as they lost their third game in their history versus the Blasters by a final-score of 3–2.

Bengaluru FC 1–0 Kerala Blasters FC (3 March 2023)
This match is regarded as one of the most controversial matches in the history of Indian club football. The match is well-known for the Blasters walking-off following the allowance of the controversial goal scored by Sunil Chhetri. This was the first eliminator in the 2022–23 ISL playoffs, and took place in Sree Kanteerava Stadium in Bangalore. Neither sides could move the scoreboard as the match ended in a goalless draw at the end of the first ninety minutes. The match proceeded into the extra-time of thirty minutes. Bengaluru received a free-kick near the Kerala Blasters penalty box in the 96th minute following a foul on Sunil Chhetri and Chhetri himself put the ball in net in what came to described as a controversial goal. The Blasters goalkeeper Prabhsukhan Gill was setting up the wall in front of him when Bengaluru's captain quickly took the free kick that shook the net. The Blasters players and staffs argued about the legitimacy of the goal to the officials, but the referee gave green light to Chhetri's goal. Following this decision, the head coach of Kerala Blasters,Ivan Vukomanović, called the players back into dressing room in protest to the poor refereeing decision. There were also debate regarding whether the referee blew the whistle for Chhetri to take the free-kick, but Chhetri later revealed that the referee gave him the permission to take the free-kick prior to the whistle. After the Blasters forfeited the match, the match referee Crystal John blew the full-time whistle after discussing with the match commissioner and Bengaluru was awarded the win and qualified to semi-finals of the playoffs by the score of 1–0 at the end of the controversial match. The Blasters later alleged that the referee asked Adrian Luna to move away from ball and hence the free kick should have only been allowed following a whistle. The club seeked for a rematch and a ban on the referee Crystal John, who controlled the match.

Crossing the divides

Players

Players who have played for at least any of the two clubs are listed below

Bengaluru FC and Kerala Blasters FC
 Bidyashagar Singh 
  Chencho Gyeltshen
  Danish Farooq Bhat
  Darren Caldeira
  Karan Sawhney
  Lalthuammawia Ralte
  Nishu Kumar
  Prabhsukhan Singh Gill
  Pratik Chaudhari
  Rahul Bheke
  Rino Anto
  Rohit Kumar
  Sandesh Jhingan
  Seiminlen Doungel
  Shankar Sampingiraj
  Thongkhosiem Haokip

Chennaiyin FC and Kerala Blasters FC
  Baoringdao Bodo
  Enes Sipović
  Godwin Franco
  Halicharan Narzary
  Karanjit Singh
  Mohammed Rafi
  Prasanth Mohan
  Shilton Paul
  Vincy Barretto
  Zakeer Mundampara
  Givson Singh

Bengaluru FC and Chennaiyin FC
  Daniel Lalhlimpuia
  Jayesh Rane
  Lalchhuanmawia
  Nikhil Bernard
  Pawan Kumar
  Raphael Augusto
  Salam Ranjan Singh
  Sena Ralte
  Thoi Singh
  Zohmingliana Ralte

Players who played for all three clubs
  C. K. Vineeth
  Harmanjot Khabra
  Siam Hanghal

Notes

See also
 Kolkata Derby
Northeast Derby
List of association football club rivalries in Asia and Oceania
List of association football rivalries

References

External links 

 Bengaluru FC Official Website
 Chennaiyin FC Official Website
 Kerala Blasters FC Official Website

Association football rivalries in India
Bengaluru FC
Chennaiyin FC
Kerala Blasters FC